86-DOS (known internally as QDOS, for Quick and Dirty Operating System) is a discontinued operating system developed and marketed by Seattle Computer Products (SCP) for its Intel 8086-based computer kit.

86-DOS shared a few of its commands with other operating systems like OS/8 and CP/M, which made it easy to port programs from the latter. Its application programming interface was very similar to that of CP/M. The system was licensed and then purchased by Microsoft and developed further as MS-DOS and PC DOS.

History

Origins
86-DOS was created because sales of the Seattle Computer Products 8086 computer kit, demonstrated in June 1979 and shipped in November, were languishing due to the absence of an operating system. The only software that SCP could sell with the board was Microsoft's Standalone Disk BASIC-86, which Microsoft had developed on a prototype of SCP's hardware. SCP wanted to offer the 8086-version of CP/M that Digital Research had initially announced for November 1979, but it was delayed and its release date was uncertain. This was not the first time Digital Research had lagged behind hardware developments; two years earlier it had been slow to adapt CP/M for new floppy disk formats and hard disk drives. In April 1980, SCP assigned 24-year-old Tim Paterson to develop a substitute for CP/M-86.

Using a CP/M-80 manual as reference Paterson modeled 86-DOS after its architecture and interfaces, but adapted to meet the requirements of Intel's 8086 16-bit processor, for easy (and partially automated) source-level translatability of the many existing 8-bit CP/M programs; porting them to either DOS or CP/M-86 was about equally difficult, and eased by the fact that Intel had already published a method that could be used to automatically translate software from the Intel 8080 processor, for which CP/M had been designed, to the new 8086 instruction set. At the same time he made a number of changes and enhancements to address what he saw as CP/M's shortcomings. CP/M cached file system information in memory for speed, but this required a user to force an update to a disk before removing it; if the user forgot, the disk would become corrupt. Paterson took the safer, but slower approach of updating the disk with each operation. CP/M's PIP command, which copied files, supported several special file names that referred to hardware devices such as printers and communication ports. Paterson built these names into the operating system as device files so that any program could use them. He gave his copying program the more intuitive name COPY. Rather than implementing CP/M's file system, he drew on Microsoft Standalone Disk BASIC-86's File Allocation Table (FAT) file system.

It touted the software's ability to read Zilog Z80 source code from a CP/M disk and translate it to 8086 source code, and promised that only "minor hand correction and optimization" was needed to produce 8086 binaries.

IBM interest
In October 1980, IBM was developing what would become the original IBM Personal Computer. CP/M was by far the most popular operating system in use at the time, and IBM felt it needed CP/M in order to compete. IBM's representatives visited Digital Research and discussed licensing with Digital Research's licensing representative, Dorothy Kildall (née McEwen), who hesitated to sign IBM's non-disclosure agreement. In later discussions between IBM and Bill Gates, Gates mentioned the existence of 86-DOS and IBM representative Jack Sams told him to get a license for it.

Creation of PC DOS
In May 1981, it hired Tim Paterson to port the system to the IBM PC, which used the slower and less expensive Intel 8088 processor and had its own specific family of peripherals. IBM watched the developments daily, submitting over 300 change requests before it accepted the product and wrote the user manual for it.

It met IBM's main criteria: it looked like CP/M, and it was easy to adapt existing 8-bit CP/M programs to run under it, notably thanks to the TRANS command which would translate source files from 8080 to 8086 machine instructions. Microsoft licensed 86-DOS to IBM, and it became PC DOS 1.0. This license also permitted Microsoft to sell DOS to other companies, which it did. The deal was spectacularly successful, and SCP later claimed in court that Microsoft had concealed its relationship with IBM in order to purchase the operating system cheaply. SCP ultimately received a  million settlement payment.

Intellectual property dispute
When Digital Research founder Gary Kildall examined PC DOS and found that it duplicated CP/M's programming interface, he wanted to sue IBM, which at the time claimed that PC DOS was its own product. However, Digital Research's attorney did not believe that the relevant law was clear enough to sue. Nonetheless, Kildall confronted IBM and persuaded them to offer CP/M-86 with the PC in exchange for a release of liability.

Controversy has continued to surround the similarity between the two systems. Perhaps the most sensational claim came from Jerry Pournelle, who said that Kildall personally demonstrated to him that DOS contained CP/M code by entering a command in DOS that displayed Kildall's name, but Pournelle never revealed the command and nobody has come forward to corroborate his story. A 2004 book about Kildall says that he used such an encrypted message to demonstrate that other manufacturers had copied CP/M, but does not say that he found the message in DOS; instead Kildall's memoir (a source for the book) pointed to the well-known interface similarity. Paterson insists that the 86-DOS software was his original work, and has denied referring to or otherwise using CP/M code while writing it. After the 2004 book appeared, he sued the authors and publishers for defamation. The court ruled in summary judgment that no defamation had occurred, as the book's claims were opinions based on research, or were not provably false.

Versions

Features

Commands
The following list of commands is supported by 86-DOS.

Internal commands

 CLEAR
 COPY
 DIR
 ERASE
 RENAME
 TYPE

External commands

 ASM
 CHKDSK
 DEBUG
 EDLIN
 HEX2BIN
 MAKRDCPM
 RDCPM
 SYS
 TRANS

EDLIN
By 1982, when IBM asked Microsoft to release a version of DOS that was compatible with a hard disk drive, PC DOS 2.0 was an almost complete rewrite of DOS, so by March 1983, very little of 86-DOS remained. The most enduring element of 86-DOS was its primitive line editor, EDLIN, which remained the only editor supplied with Microsoft versions of DOS until the June 1991 release of MS-DOS 5.0, which included a text-based user interface editor called MS-DOS Editor, based on QBasic. EDLIN can still be used on contemporary machines, since there is an emulated DOS environment up to Windows 10 (32 bit).

Supported disk formats
Seattle Computer Products' 86-DOS supported the FAT12 filesystem on a range of 8-inch and 5.25-inch floppy disk drives on S-100 floppy disk controller hardware manufactured by Cromemco, Tarbell Electronics and North Star Computers. The Western Digital FD1771-based Cromemco and Tarbell boards supported one-sided, single-density soft-sectored drives. A Tarbell double-density board utilizing the FD1791 was supported as well. Later, SCP offered advanced floppy disk controllers, like the Disk Master series.

86-DOS did not take advantage of a FAT ID byte or BIOS parameter block (BPB), as later DOS versions do, to distinguish between different media formats; instead different drive letters were hard-coded at time of compilation to be associated with different physical floppy drives, sides and densities. That meant, depending on its type, a disk had to be addressed under a certain drive letter to be recognized correctly.  This concept was later emulated with more flexibility by DRIVER.SYS under DOS 3.x and later versions.

Two logical format variants of the 86-DOS 12-bit FAT format existed—the original format with 16-byte directory entries and the later format (since 86-DOS 0.42) with 32-byte directory entries. Only the second one is logically compatible with the FAT12 format known since the release of MS-DOS and PC DOS. MS-DOS still cannot mount such volumes, as in absence of a BPB it falls back to retrieve the FAT ID in the FAT entry for cluster 0 to choose among hard-coded disk geometry profiles. In all formats of a volume formatted under MS-DOS that would otherwise be supported by both systems and typically also in all other formats, this ID is located in the first byte of logical sector 1—that is, the volume's second sector with physical cylinder-head-sector (CHS) address 0/0/2 or logical block addressing (LBA) address 1—since MS-DOS assumes a single reserved sector, the boot sector. Under 86-DOS, the reserved sectors area is significantly larger (whole tracks), and therefore the prototypical FAT ID  (and ) is located elsewhere on disk, making it impossible for MS-DOS to retrieve it, and even if it would, the hard-coded disk profile associated with it would not take this larger reserved sectors region under 86-DOS into account.

CP/M 2 floppy media were readable through RDCPM.

86-DOS did not offer any specific support for fixed disks, but third-party solutions in form of hard disk controllers and corresponding I/O system extensions for 86-DOS were available from companies like Tallgrass Technologies, making hard disks accessible similar to superfloppies within the size limits of the FAT12 file system.

Various OEM versions of MS-DOS 1.2x and 2.x supported a number of similar 8-inch FAT12 floppy disk formats as well, although not identical to those supported by 86-DOS.

Disk formats supported by one of the last versions developed by Tim Paterson at Microsoft, MS-DOS 1.25  (March 1982) for the SCP Gazelle computer with SCP controller or Cromemco 16FDC controller (by default, this version only supported the MS-DOS-compatible variants of the 8.0 in formats with a single reserved sector but it could be built to provide two extra drive letters to read and write floppies in the previous SCP 86-DOS 8.0 in disk formats since 0.42 as well):

In 1984 Seattle Computer Products released an OEM version of MS-DOS 2.0 for the SCP S-100 computer with SCP-500 Disk Master Floppy controller. It added support for 5.25 in DD/1S (180 KB) and DD/2S (360 KB) FAT12 formats and supported the older formats as well, although possibly with some of the parameters modified compared to MS-DOS 1.25.

See also
 MIDAS
 MSX-DOS

Notes

References

Further reading
  (41 pages)

External links
 86-DOS documentation from Paterson Technology
 Run SCP 86-DOS 1.0 in the Altair 8800 SIMH simulator by Howard M. Harte

Microcomputer software
Disk operating systems
DOS variants
Floppy disk-based operating systems
Discontinued operating systems
Proprietary operating systems
1979 software
Assembly language software
CategoryProducts and services discontinued in 1981